Department of Agricultural Extension is a government department responsible for agricultural research in Bangladesh. It is located in Dhaka.

History
The Agriculture Directorate (Extension and Management) and Jute directorate were established in 1975 by the government of Bangladesh. The Department of Agricultural Extension was formed in 1982 through the merger of Agriculture Directorate (Extension and Management), Jute Directorate, Plant Protection Directorate, Horticulture Board, Tobacco Development Board, and Central Extension Resource and Development Institute (CERDI). The department carried out Training and Visit programs to train farmers till 1990 and then adapted group training. The government of Bangladesh adapted the New Agriculture Extension Policy (NAEP) in 1996 to plan the activities of the department. It is under the Ministry of Agriculture.

References

1982 establishments in Bangladesh
Government agencies of Bangladesh
Government departments of Bangladesh
Organisations based in Dhaka